Los caprichos (The Caprices) is a set of 80 prints in aquatint and etching created by the Spanish artist Francisco Goya in 1797–1798, and published as an album in 1799. The prints were an artistic experiment: a medium for Goya's condemnation of the universal follies and foolishness in the Spanish society in which he lived. The criticisms are far-ranging and acidic; the images expose the predominance of superstition, the ignorance and inabilities of the various members of the ruling class, pedagogical short-comings, marital mistakes and the decline of rationality. Some of the prints have anticlerical themes. Goya described the series as depicting "the innumerable foibles and follies to be found in any civilized society, and from the common prejudices and deceitful practices which custom, ignorance or self-interest have made usual".

Goya added brief explanations of each image to a manuscript, now in the Museo del Prado, which help explain his often cryptic intentions, as do the titles printed below each image.
Despite the relatively vague language of Goya's captions in the Caprichos, as well as Goya’s public announcement that his themes were from the "extravagances and follies common to all society," they were likely interpreted as references to well-known governmental and/or aristocratic figures. As he explained in the announcement, Goya chose subjects "from the multitude of follies and blunders common in every civil society, as well as from the vulgar prejudices and lies authorized by custom, ignorance or interest, those that he has thought most suitable matter for ridicule". Nonetheless, the Caprichos were withdrawn from sale after a brief period of time.

The work was a tour-de-force critique of 18th-century Spain, and humanity in general, from the point of view of the Enlightenment. The informal style, as well as the depiction of contemporary society found in Caprichos, makes them (and Goya himself) a precursor to the modernist movement almost a century later. The Sleep of Reason Produces Monsters in particular has attained an iconic status.

Goya's series, and the last group of prints in his series The Disasters of War, which he called "caprichos enfáticos" ("emphatic caprices"), are far from the spirit of light-hearted fantasy the term "caprice" usually suggests in art.

History
Los caprichos were withdrawn from public sale very shortly after their release in 1799, after only 27 copies of the set had been purchased. In 1803, Goya offered the Caprichos''' copper plates and the first edition's unsold sets to King Charles IV in return for a pension for his son.
Later in life, Goya wrote that he had felt it prudent to withdraw the prints from circulation due to the Inquisition.

Subsequently, the set has been very influential, and not only in the visual arts. Its influence can be seen, for example, in:
 Granados' piano suite Goyescas, a work which has entered the standard piano repertory since its 2 parts were premiered in 1911 and 1914 respectively. It includes a number called El amor y la muerte (a title shared with no. 10 of the caprichos)
 Mario Castelnuovo-Tedesco's guitar work 24 caprichos de Goya, Op. 195 (1961)

Gallery

See also
List of works by Francisco Goya

Notes

References
 Albert Boime, A Social History of Modern Art. University of Chicago Press, 1991. .
 John J. Ciofalo, "Quixotic Dreams of Reason." The Self-Portraits of Francisco Goya. Cambridge University Press, 2001.
 Francisco Goya, Los Caprichos''. New York: Dover Publications, 1969.

Further reading

External links
 Caprichos (PDF in the Arno Schmidt Reference Library)
Translation of the 1799 Advertisement for sale of the series
Pruebas de estado

1799 books
1797 prints
1798 prints
Capric
18th-century etchings
Satirical works
Anti-clerical art